The 1986 Cotton Bowl Classic was the 50th edition of the college football bowl game, played at the Cotton Bowl in Dallas, Texas, on Wednesday, January 1. Part of the 1985–86 bowl game season, it matched the sixteenth-ranked Auburn Tigers of the Southeastern Conference (SEC) and the Texas A&M Aggies of the Southwest Conference (SWC). A slight underdog, Texas A&M won by twenty points, 36–16.

Teams

Auburn

Auburn was highlighted by running back Bo Jackson, who rushed for 1,786 yards and won the Heisman Trophy for a team that had at one point was ranked #1 before losing to Tennessee. They finished 8–3, but that was only good for sixth in the SEC, finishing behind the three teams that had beaten them (Tennessee, Florida, and Alabama).

Texas A&M

Jackie Sherrill was in his fourth year as head coach of the Aggies, his previous three years finishing with a combined 16–16–1. They won the Southwest Conference championship for the first time since 1976; their previous  appearance in the Cotton Bowl was eighteen years earlier in 1968.

Game summary
Televised by CBS, the game kicked off shortly after 12:30 p.m. CST, as did the Fiesta Bowl on NBC.

Bo Jackson started the scoring for Auburn with a touchdown run early in the game after a fumble recovery. But A&M responded with their own touchdown run by Harry Johnson, and they scored just three minutes later, but it was only 12–6 A&M, due to a missed extra point and a failed conversion attempt. Jackson stuck back for Auburn by catching a 73-yard touchdown pass from Pat Washington to give Auburn the lead again, though they missed the conversion attempt. Scott Slater kicked a 26-yard field goal to give A&M the lead again at halftime, 15–13.

Anthony Toney increased A&M's lead with a two-yard touchdown run early in the third quarter, but another failed conversion attempt meant it was still a one possession lead at 21–13. Auburn mustered a field goal by Chris Johnson to make it 21–16 entering the fourth quarter. Auburn drove to the A&M six-yard line as the fourth quarter began, but they were stuffed four times. Auburn was given another chance when A&M punted, but Jackson was stuffed again at A&M's 27. From that point on, A&M took control. With 2:22 to go, Keith Woodside caught a touchdown pass, as they also succeeded in gaining the two-point conversion. After an interception seconds later, Anthony Toney added on with his second rushing touchdown of the day to make it 36–16 as time expired.

Scoring
First quarter
Auburn – Bo Jackson 5-yard run (Chris Johnson kick)
Texas A&M – Harry Johnson 11-yard run (Eric Franklin kick failed)
Texas A&M – Keith Woodside 22-yard run (pass failed)
Second quarter
Auburn – Jackson 73-yard pass from Pat Washington (run failed)
Texas A&M – Scott Slater 26-yard field goal
Third quarter
Texas A&M – Anthony Toney 21-yard run (pass failed)
Auburn – Johnson 26-yard field goal
Fourth quarter
Texas A&M – Woodside 9-yard pass from Kevin Murray (Rod Bernstine run)
Texas A&M – Toney 1-yard run (Slater kick)

Outstanding players of the game
Auburn: Bo Jackson who had rushed for 129 yards on 31 carries along with 2 catches for 73 yards.
Texas A&M: Domingo Bryant, who intercepted two passes*

Statistics
{| class=wikitable style="text-align:center"
! Statistics !! Auburn !! Texas A&M
|-
| First Downs || 16 ||21
|-
| Yards Rushing|| 54–198 || 48–186
|-
| Yards Passing|| 154 ||292
|-
|Passing (C–A–I)|| 7–17–2 || 16–26–1
|-
|Total Offense || 71–352 || 74–478
|-
|Return Yards || 48 || 51
|-
|Punts-Average ||5-43.8 ||5–45.0
|-
|Fumbles-Lost || 2–1 || 1–1
|-
|Turnovers||3||2
|-
|Penalties-Yards ||1–5 ||5–45
|-
|Time of possession||30:46 ||29:14
|}

Aftermath
Texas A&M played in the next two Cotton Bowls (1987, 1988), winning the latter.  Auburn went on to five more consecutive bowl games under Dye before he resigned after the 1992 season. They returned to the Cotton Bowl 21 years later, and defeated Nebraska, 17–14.

References

1985–86 NCAA football bowl games
Cotton Bowl Classic
Auburn Tigers football bowl games
Texas A&M Aggies football bowl games
Cotton Bowl
January 1986 sports events in the United States